Mark Anderson (born November 23, 1954) was a member of the Arizona House of Representatives and the Arizona Senate, serving two stretches in the House and a single term in the Senate. He was first elected to the House representing District 29 in November 1994, and was re-elected three times, in 1996, 1998, and 2000. Due to Arizona's term limit policy, Anderson could not run for the House again in 2002, so instead ran for the Senate.  Due to redistricting, he ran in the new 18th District, and won the Senate seat, where he served from 2003 to 2005. In 2004 he again ran for the House, winning the seat from the 18th District. He won re-election in 2006.

References

Republican Party members of the Arizona House of Representatives
Republican Party Arizona state senators
1954 births
Living people